The United Protestant Church, also known as The Church of a Thousand Trees, is a historic church located at the corner of South Denali Street and East Elmwood Avenue in Palmer, Alaska. It is a rustic log two-story structure, in the shape of a cross. A small bell tower with a dormer roof rises just above the main entrance.  The interior is shaped from rustic log elements, with carved pews.  The church property includes a manse and garage, built from similar materials.

The church was listed on the National Register of Historic Places in 1980.

See also
National Register of Historic Places listings in Matanuska-Susitna Borough, Alaska

References

1937 establishments in the United States
Buildings and structures in Matanuska-Susitna Borough, Alaska
Presbyterian churches in Alaska
Churches on the National Register of Historic Places in Alaska
Churches completed in 1937
Buildings and structures on the National Register of Historic Places in Matanuska-Susitna Borough, Alaska
Individually listed contributing properties to historic districts on the National Register in Alaska